Stark Bro's Nurseries & Orchards Co. is a horticultural company based in Louisiana, Missouri, that specializes in growing and selling fruit trees to home gardeners and orchardists. The company was the original marketer of the Red Delicious and Golden Delicious apples.

History
In 1816, James Hart Stark moved from Kentucky to Louisiana, Missouri. He brought with him a bundle of apple scions. From his bundle he started a nursery business, which was officially incorporated in 1889.

In 1893, Stark Bro's held their first International New Fruit Fair. Jesse Hiatt, who owned an orchard in Peru, Iowa, sent samples of his fruit to compete in the contest for the best new fruit. Hiatt's apples won the judging, but his nametag could not be found. He submitted samples of the same apple the following year and won again. This, time there was a nametag and the apples could be identified. The Stark brothers traveled to the Hiatt farm and bought the rights to the Red Delicious apple in 1894.

In 1914, the Stark Golden Delicious apple was discovered and developed. The original tree was found on the Mullins' family farm in Clay County, West Virginia and was locally known as Mullin's Yellow Seedling and Annit apple. Anderson Mullins sold the tree and propagation rights to Stark Bro's Nurseries & Orchards Co., which first marketed it as a companion to their Red Delicious apple in 1914. They collaborated with Luther Burbank who willed over 750 of his varieties to the company.

In June 2001 the possibility of closure to Stark Brothers Nurseries, Louisiana, Missouri's oldest and largest employer, famous worldwide for the fruit trees it grew and sold was a reality. However, the alarm was short-lived.   By fall of that year, Stark Bro's was back as two separate business Stark Bro's Fulfillment Services and Stark Brothers Nurseries and Orchards.

Presidents
James Hart Stark
William Watts Stark
Clarence McDowell Stark
Edgar Winfred Stark
Clay Hamilton Stark
Edwin Jackson Stark
John Stark Logan
Clay Stark Logan
Cameron G. Brown

Current Operation
Stark Bro’s has three main business areas: e-Commerce/Mail-Order, Wholesale and the retail Garden Center. The operations include:
250 growing acres in Louisiana
427 growing acres in Atlas, IL
1 million cubic feet of climate-controlled warehouse space 
1 million cubic feet of non-refrigerated work/storage area
1.7 million cubic feet of cold storage
5 acres of greenhouses
30,000 square feet of office space

One million trees per year are shipped from Stark Bro’s facilities.

References

External links

Official Website
Plants Nursery

Plant nurseries
Pike County, Missouri